Vilma Rimšaitė (born 24 February 1983 in Šiauliai) is a Lithuanian BMX cyclist.

In the 2009 UCI BMX World Championships she won a bronze medal.

Rimšaitė was appointed as a member of the inaugural UCI Athletes' Commission in 2011.

References

External links
 profile

1983 births
Living people
Lithuanian female cyclists
Downhill mountain bikers
Sportspeople from Šiauliai
BMX riders
Cyclists at the 2012 Summer Olympics
Olympic cyclists of Lithuania
Universiade medalists in cycling
Lithuanian mountain bikers
Universiade gold medalists for Lithuania
European Games competitors for Lithuania
Cyclists at the 2015 European Games
Medalists at the 2011 Summer Universiade